Dorris may refer to:

Dorris (surname)
Dorris, California, a city in Siskiyou County
Dorris Motors Corporation, a car manufacturer that ended production in 1926

See also
Doris (disambiguation)